was a town located in Oku District, Okayama Prefecture, Japan.

As of 2003, the town had an estimated population of 19,389 and a density of 282.19 persons per km². The total area was 68.71 km².

On November 1, 2004, Oku, along with the towns of Osafune and Ushimado (all from Oku District), was merged to create the city of Setouchi.

Dissolved municipalities of Okayama Prefecture
Populated places disestablished in 2004
2004 disestablishments in Japan
Setouchi, Okayama